San Juan Mixtepec (Mixtec: Ñuu Snuviko) is a town and municipality in Oaxaca in south-western Mexico. The municipality covers an area of 209.24 km², and is part of the Juxtlahuaca District of the Mixteca Region.

Its Mixtepec name, Ñuu Snuviko, translates to "place where the clouds descend."

As of 2005, the municipality had a total population of 7,423.

References

Municipalities of Oaxaca